Alex Greenwood (born 7 September 1993) is an English professional footballer who plays for Manchester City in the FA Women's Super League and the England national team. Mainly a left-back, she can also play as a centre-back and is considered to be a set-piece specialist.

She has previously played for Olympique Lyonnais in the French Division 1 Féminine as well as English clubs Manchester United, Liverpool, Notts County and Everton where she began her career. Greenwood has played for the England national football team since 2014 and was named the FA Women's Young Player of the Year in 2012.

Club career

Everton
Liverpool-born Greenwood joined Everton at the age of eight, and progressed through the club's Centre of Excellence. On 5 August 2010, she made her first team debut in a 6–0 2010–11 UEFA Women's Champions League qualification round win against KÍ. Two days later, in the same competition, Greenwood scored a penalty kick in the 80th minute in a 10–0 victory over FK Borec.

When Everton's longstanding left-back Rachel Unitt signed for Birmingham City after the 2011 FA WSL season, Greenwood took over her place in the team. Throughout the 2012 season she performed so well that she was named FA Young Player of the Year at FA Women's Football Awards in November.

Greenwood played in Everton's 2–0 defeat by Arsenal in the 2014 FA Women's Cup final.

Notts County
 
When the 2014 season culminated in Everton's relegation, Greenwood requested to leave in order to protect her national team place ahead of the 2015 FIFA Women's World Cup. She signed for Notts County on a two-year contract for an undisclosed transfer fee. The move disappointed Everton who wanted Greenwood to leave on loan and come back if they were promoted again.

Liverpool
In January 2016, she joined Liverpool. At the club, she scored in each of the three seasons in the two-year spell with the club, the first came from the penalty spot against Sunderland. At the end of the 2017–18 season, after 44 appearances and six goals, Greenwood was released by the club.

Manchester United

On 13 July 2018, it was announced that Greenwood was joining and would captain Manchester United for their inaugural season. She made her competitive debut for Manchester United in a 1–0 League Cup victory against former club Liverpool on 19 August. On 20 September, she made her Championship debut in a 3–0 win against Sheffield United. On 18 November, she scored her first goal for the club from the penalty spot in a 5–0 win away at Crystal Palace. Greenwood helped Manchester United win the Championship and gain promotion to the FA WSL in their debut season.

Olympique Lyonnais
On 4 August 2019, Manchester United announced they had agreed a deal for the transfer of Greenwood to French Division 1 Féminine team Olympique Lyonnais, subject to personal terms. Lyon confirmed the deal on 8 August for a fee of €40,000, plus €20,000 in potential add-ons. On 24 August, she made her league debut for the club in a 6–0 home win against Olympique Marseille.

On 30 August 2020, Greenwood made her first Champions League appearance since 2010, entering as a stoppage time substitute for Eugénie Le Sommer as Lyon beat Wolfsburg 3–1 in the final.

By the end of her one-year contract with Lyon she had played 17 matches and won a quadruple of trophies including the Champions league.

Manchester City
On 9 September 2020, Greenwood returned to England, signing a three-year contract with Manchester City following the expiration of her Lyon contract. In one of her first games she helped win the FA Women's Cup with Manchester City at the end of the 2019/20 season.

International career
 
Greenwood captained England at youth level and played at the 2012 UEFA Women's Under-19 Championship. Senior national team coach Mark Sampson selected her for the 2014 Cyprus Cup, where she made her debut against Italy on 5 March 2014. She scored her first goal for England in September 2014 in a 10–0 win against Montenegro.

At the 2015 FIFA Women's World Cup, youngest member of the squad Greenwood shared England's left-back duties with Claire Rafferty. She won a bronze medal when the team beat Germany in the third place play-off.

In 2019, Greenwood was part of the England team that won the SheBelieves Cup in the United States. Later that year, Greenwood was selected as part of England's World Cup squad. As part of England's social-media facing squad announcement, her name was announced by singer Olly Murs. On 23 June, Greenwood scored England's third goal in the 3–0 round of 16 win against Cameroon as England went on to finish fourth.

Greenwood was also included in the England squad that won UEFA Women's Euro 2022.

She first captained England during an Arnold Clark Cup match on 19 February 2023, having previously worn the armband after a series of substitutions in England's 20–0 victory over Latvia on 30 November 2021, becoming the fourth captain in that match.

Personal life
Although she joined Everton aged eight and signed her first professional contract with the club, Greenwood was brought up supporting Merseyside rivals Liverpool and admired Jamie Carragher. She attended Savio Salesian College. Greenwood is in a relationship with Jack O'Connell, also a professional footballer for Sheffield United. Greenwood has spoken out, on a number of occasions, about the online abuse that she and some of her colleagues receive regularly, which have included comments about her appearance, transfers and threats against her family. Greenwood generally opts to keep her personal life private and tends to keep her social media posts football-related.

Career statistics

Club

International

Scores and results list England's goal tally first, score column indicates score after each Greenwood goal.

Honours
Manchester United
FA Women's Championship: 2018–19

Olympique Lyonnais
Trophée des Championnes: 2019
Division 1 Féminine: 2019–20
Coupe de France: 2019–20
UEFA Women's Champions League: 2019–20

Manchester City
Women's FA Cup: 2019–20
FA WSL Cup: 2021–22

England

FIFA Women's World Cup third place: 2015
UEFA Women's Championship: 2022
Cyprus Cup: 2015
SheBelieves Cup: 2019
Arnold Clark Cup: 2022, 2023

Individual
FA Young Player of the Year: 2012
PFA WSL Team of the Year: 2015–16, 2021–22
Freedom of the City of London (announced 1 August 2022)

References

External links

 Profile at the Olympique Lyonnais website
 

Living people
English women's footballers
Footballers from Liverpool
1993 births
Women's Super League players
England women's under-23 international footballers
England women's international footballers
Everton F.C. (women) players
Notts County L.F.C. players
Liverpool F.C. Women players
Manchester United W.F.C. players
Association footballers' wives and girlfriends
2015 FIFA Women's World Cup players
Women's association football fullbacks
2019 FIFA Women's World Cup players
Olympique Lyonnais Féminin players
Division 1 Féminine players
Expatriate women's footballers in France
England women's youth international footballers
UEFA Women's Euro 2022 players
UEFA Women's Championship-winning players
UEFA Women's Euro 2017 players